Sunia Turuva (born 4 September 2002) is a Fiji international rugby league footballer who plays as a  or er for the Penrith Panthers in the NRL.

Background
Turuva played his junior rugby league for the Berala Bears.

Career

2022
Turuva made his international debut for Fiji, scoring two tries and running 252 metres in a 24-12 loss in the 2022 Pacific Test vs Papua New Guinea.

In round 21 of the 2022 NRL season, Turuva made his first grade debut for Penrith against Canberra at GIO Stadium.

Turuva spent the majority of 2022 playing for Penrith's NSW Cup team.  Turuva scored two tries for Penrith in their 2022 NSW Cup Grand Final victory over Canterbury.

On 2 October, Turuva scored a try in Penrith's 44-10 victory over Norths Devils in the NRL State Championship final.

In October he was named in the Fiji squad for the 2021 Rugby League World Cup.

In November he was named in the 2021 RLWC Team of the Tournament.

2023
On 18 February, Turuva played in Penrith's 13-12 upset loss to St Helens RFC in the 2023 World Club Challenge.

References

External links
Panthers profile
Fiji profile

2002 births
Living people
Australian rugby league players
Australian people of Fijian descent
Fiji national rugby league team players
Penrith Panthers players
Rugby league fullbacks
Rugby league players from Sydney